is a Japanese manga written and illustrated by Junya Inoue. It has been serialized by Wani Books in Comic Gum from 2002, and collected in 12 tankōbon volumes released from December, 2002 to September 23, 2008. The series is licensed in North America by Central Park Media and in France by Doki-Doki.

Plot
The series follows Yousuke Suruga, a high school student, whose body has been merged with the Bow of Suzaku, a legendary weapon, for breaking an ancient Shinto shrine. To save himself and his hometown he uses the Bow of Suzaku against demons.

Characters
Suruga Yousuke -  is the main character of the story and wielder of bow of suzaku. He unknowingly sacrificed his future for the bow therefore he has only one year to live.

Yomogi Inaba - is the female lead who can see sprits and is protected by the fox sprits.

Manga
Otogi Matsuri: Dark Offering written and illustrated by Junya Inoue. It has been serialized by Wani Books in Comic Gum from 2002. The individual chapters were collected in 12 tankōbon volumes which were released from December, 2002 to September 23, 2008. The series is licensed in North America by Central Park Media, which released its first tankōbon volume on September 1, 2007. The manga is licensed in France by Doki-Doki, which released the first tankōbon volume on October 11, 2006.

References

External links
 Official Otogi Matsuri website 
 

Action anime and manga
2002 manga
CPM Press
Seinen manga
Supernatural anime and manga
Wani Books manga
Shinchosha manga